is a railway station located in Kitakyūshū, Fukuoka.

Lines 

Chikuhō Electric Railroad
Chikuhō Electric Railroad Line

Platforms

Adjacent stations

Surrounding area
 Fukuoka Prefectural Route 11
 Anō Elementary School
 Yahatanishi Tokubetushien Special Needs School
 Japan Organization for Employment of the Elderly, Persons with Disabilities and Job Seekers (Fukuoka Branch)
 Hagiwara Elementary School
 Yahata Library Oike Branch
 Fukuoka Legal Affairs Bureau Yahata Branch Office
 Kyushu Red Cross Blood Center
 Yahatanishi Fire Department

Railway stations in Fukuoka Prefecture
Railway stations in Japan opened in 1956